Shalu is a railway station on the Taiwan Railways Administration West Coast line (Coastal line). It was built in May 1919 and is located in Shalu District, Taichung, Taiwan.

Structure
The station was first built as a wooden structure due to the extreme slopes.

Service
Services began in December 1920 for passengers and cargo.

Around the station
 Hungkuang University
 Mitsui Outlet Park Taichung
 Providence University

See also
 List of railway stations in Taiwan

References

1920 establishments in Taiwan
Railway stations in Taichung
Railway stations opened in 1920
Railway stations served by Taiwan Railways Administration